St Cuthbert's Church (formerly the United Presbyterian Church) was a church building in the Scottish town of Dunoon, Argyll and Bute. It was built in 1874, to a design by noted architect Robert Alexander Bryden, who also designed the adjacent Dunoon Burgh Hall around the same time. The church stood for 120 years, before being demolished in 1994. A block of flats, erected in 2016, now stands on the site at 191 Argyll Street. A planning application was first made for a similar construction in 1998.

References

External links

Churches in Dunoon
Former churches in Scotland
1874 establishments in Scotland
1994 establishments in Scotland
Demolished buildings and structures in Scotland
Buildings and structures demolished in 1994